Cerithiopsis guitarti is a species of sea snail, a gastropod in the family Cerithiopsidae, which is known from the Caribbean Sea and the Gulf of Mexico. It was described by Espinosa and Ortea, in 2001.

Description 
The maximum recorded shell length is 2.5 mm.

Habitat 
Minimum recorded depth is 20 m. Maximum recorded depth is 20 m.

References

guitarti
Gastropods described in 2001